Gentiana sedifolia is a species of plant in the family Gentianaceae. It can be found from Costa Rica to northern Chile.

Description
Small herbs with narrow, opposite leaves; leaves up to 0.7 cm long. Small funnel shaped flowers up to 1 cm in diameter, pale blue or violet, with a yellow, white or pale yellow center. Flowers close at night or during cold and cloudy days.

Distribution and habitat
Bogs at high elevation grasslands (puna and páramo), from Costa Rica to northern Chile. It is present at protected areas such as Cajas National Park, Huascarán National Park and Junín National Reserve.

Vernacular names
Genciana (Colombia); pinjachi (Bolivia).

References

Flora of Peru
Flora of Bolivia
Flora of Colombia
Flora of Ecuador
Flora of Costa Rica
Flora of Chile
Flora of Argentina